The International Arnold Schönberg Prize was established in 2001, and named after the Austrian composer Arnold Schönberg, on initiative of Kent Nagano, the former principal conductor and musical director of the Deutsches Symphonie-Orchester Berlin, together with Deutschlandradio. The prize is awarded by the Arnold Schönberg Center (Vienna, Austria) to international composers. The prize money is €12,500.

Winners

 2001 George Benjamin 
 2004 Jörg Widmann
 2005 Unsuk Chin
 2006 Aribert Reimann
 2008 Helmut Oehring

References

Awards established in 2001
Classical music awards
International music awards